Albert Barnett "Buster" Hill (August 12, 1896 – October 13, 1969) was a college football player.

Early years
Albert Barnett Hill was born on August 12, 1896, in Washington, Georgia, to William Meriwether Hill and Susan Montgomery Stokes.  He attended Washington High.

Georgia Tech
Hill entered the Georgia Institute of Technology in 1913. He was a prominent player for John Heisman's Georgia Tech Golden Tornado football teams. Hill was elected to the Georgia Tech Athletics Hall of Fame in 1966.

1917
Hill was the quarterback for Georgia Tech's first national championship team in 1917, which outscored opponents 491 to 17. That year, he received the most carries while leading one of the greatest ever backfields alongside Everett Strupper, Joe Guyon, and Judy Harlan. Hill led the nation in touchdowns. Sometimes simply referred to as the "diminutive quarterback," Hill was selected as a second-team All-American at the end of the 1917 season by Jack Veiock, sports editor of the International News Service (INS).  Heisman considered the 1917 team the best one he ever coached, and for many years the team was considered the greatest football team the South ever produced.

See also 

 List of Georgia Tech Yellow Jackets starting quarterbacks

References

External links

American football quarterbacks
Georgia Tech Yellow Jackets football players
All-Southern college football players
1896 births
1969 deaths
People from Washington, Georgia
Players of American football from Georgia (U.S. state)